The NASA Exceptional Technology Achievement Medal is an award given for technology contributions achieved in one of the following:

 Early technology development significantly contributing to the NASA mission 
 Exemplary collaborative effort in achieving significant technology transfer 
 Exceptional utilization of a NASA-developed technology resulting in a significant commercial application

See also 
 List of NASA awards

References
 NASA awards
 National Aeronautics and Space Administration Honor Awards (1969-1978)

External links
NASA Awards

Exceptional Technology Achievement Medal